This article shows the rosters of all participating teams at the 2018 FIBA Under-18 Women's Asian Championship in Bangalore, India.

Division A

Australia

China

Chinese Taipei

Indonesia

Japan

Malaysia

New Zealand

South Korea

Division B

Guam

Hong Kong

India

Iran

Kazakhstan

Samoa

Singapore

Syria

References

FIBA